Weckmann is a type of pastry in German-speaking countries.

People with the surname Weckmann or Weckman 
Weckmann or Weckman is also a German surname that may refer to:
Jouni Weckman, Finnish curler
Mary Ann Weckman (married name Scherr; 1921–2016), American designer and educator
 Matthias Weckmann (c. 1616–1674), German musician and composer
Niklaus Weckmann (active c. 1481–1526), German sculptor
Verner Weckman (1882–1968), Finnish wrestler

German-language surnames